List of English football transfers 2009–10 may refer to:

List of English football transfers summer 2009
List of English football transfers winter 2009–10
List of English football transfers summer 2010

Transfers
2009